A jengu (plural miengu) is a water spirit in the traditional beliefs of the Sawa ethnic groups of Cameroon, particularly the Duala, Bakweri, Malimba, Batanga, Bakoko, Oroko people and related Sawa peoples. Among the Bakweri, the name is liengu (plural: maengu). Miengu are similar to Mami Wata spirits Bakoko the name is Bisima. 

The miengu's appearance differs from people to people, but they are typically said to be beautiful, mermaid-like figures with long hair and beautiful gap-teeth. They live in rivers and the sea and bring good fortune to those who worship them. They can also cure disease and act as intermediaries between worshippers and the world of spirits. For this reason, a jengu cult has long enjoyed popularity among the Duala peoples. Among the Bakweri, this cult is also an important part of a young girl's rite of passage into womanhood.

As a single spirit
Jengu may refer to a single spirit, as well. In some traditions, this spirit replaces the class of miengu spirits, while in others, it acts as their leader. Among the Isubu, for example, this spirit is called Jengu.

Bakweri belief talks of a female spirit named Mojili or Mojele. Mojili became the progenitor of the miengu when she lost a bet with Moto, the ancestor of mankind, over who could build the longer-lasting fire. Moto won the right to stay in the village, but Mojili was forced to flee to the sea. The Bakweri still worship Mojili as the ruler of the miengu. In fact, her name is so powerful, that many believe that children under seven may die if they hear it uttered. By extension of this tale, the miengu are said to be the wives of the rats, as the ancestor of the rats also lost the bet and fled to the forest.

Another Bakweri tradition names this spirit Liengu la Mwanja and makes her the consort of Efasa-Moto, spirit of Mount Fako (Mount Cameroon). Long ago, the two formed an understanding that Efasa-Moto would live on the mountain, while Liengu la Mwanja would inhabit the sea. When lava from Mount Fako's 1992 eruption made it all the way to the ocean, many hailed it as a sign that the spirit was visiting his wife.

Jengu cult
The Duala and related groups hold the jengu cult in high importance. The cult may have originated with peoples further west, possibly the Ijo, and then passed from people to people, reaching the Batanga at its most eastward extent. In the earliest days, jengu-worship centred on the water spirits as the source of four boons: crayfish, the end of the rainy season in one of the world's wettest regions, victory in the pirogue races, and protection from epidemics of disease. Among the Duala proper, membership was originally reserved to "free" (pure-blooded) Duala, a stipulation that even excluded members of the prestigious Akwa clan due to one of their ancestors being a Longasse woman. Observations by European traders and explorers prove that jengu-worship was well established by the early 19th century. Early missionaries largely failed in their attempts to suppress it.

The cult is still active in Cameroon's Littoral and Southwest Provinces. Both males and females are eligible to join, though this openness may be a fairly recent development. Jengu-worship is primarily male among the Duala , Malimba proper, but among the Bakweri, on the other hand, the cult is primarily for women.

Ceremonies and rituals
Jengu worship centres on a secret society led by an individual known as the ekale. This person traditionally wears a mask at all meetings, though this practice all but died out by the mid-20th century. Anyone can supplicate the miengu, however, and the simplest rituals involve nothing more than prayers or sacrifices to the deities before fishing or traveling by water.

Early jengu worshippers performed rituals in pirogues on the Wouri River, its tributaries and estuary, and on nearby islands. The person would first dress in ceremonial garb, a cape, skirt, and headdress of raffia fronds, and carry palm fronds and wooden paddles. He would then summon the miengu and offer them oblations of food and drink. He might also visit a jengu shrine further up the Wouri.

Much jengu worship is related to healing and medicine, and the miengu are called upon when mainstream healing fails. For example, a jengu doctor can treat a patient by first sacrificing a cock and goat. He then administers a vomit-inducing medicine and waves a small stool over the patient's head. The one treated must then follow a series of taboos. Among the Bakweri, this rite is known as Liengu la Vafea. 

The highest-profile miengu ceremony today is the annual Ngondo celebration in Douala, first held in 1949. The night before the fête's culmination, members of the jengu cult hold a private ceremony at Jebale Island on the Wouri. There they sacrifice to the water spirits and prepare a package of gifts. The next day, this offering is presented to the miengu during a public ceremony on a beach near Douala. One cult member dives into the sea with the gift and stays down as long as possible. Afterward, he returns with a message from the miengu about the year to come.

The climax of the ngondo festival is the jengu cult. Wherein the traditional diver goes into the river under supervision of the traditional rulers. This undisclosed custodian of tradition, accompanied by a woman and two men, embarks on a ritual boat. He will then submerge himself in the middle of the river and stay underneath the water for three to ten minutes. It is believed that he visits the kingdom of their ancestors (spirits) beneath the waters. He returns with news of the successor of the ngondo presidency and a coded message from the gods of the land in a calabash. One mystery of this ritual is that the calabash, which the diver holds as he re-emerges from underneath the river, is dry.

Induction
The rites observed by the Bakweri people of Mount Cameroon serve as an example of similar rituals among other coastal groups. 

Toward the coast, the Bakweri practice two major induction rituals. In the Liengu la Ndiva, cult members take a seizure or collapse as a sign that a young girl is ready for induction. A cult member then speaks to her in a secret liengu language, and if she seems to understand any of it, a traditional healer begins the initiation rites. The girl must live in seclusion for several months, during which she must follow a strict set of taboos and may see visions of spirits. She also receives a secret name and teaching in the secret liengu language. Eventually, the healer releases her into the custody of a group of strong men and a number of women singing in the liengu language. The men take turns carrying her until she reaches the middle of a stream. There, the healer plunges her in, inducting her into the cult. Meanwhile, other cult members attempt to capture a crab from the waters, as this animal represents the liengu spirit. The new member's taboos remain, however, and she must live in seclusion for several more months. Finally, the cult holds a feast in her honour, and the initiation comes to an end. The entire process takes the better part of a year.

An alternate Bakweri initiation ritual is the Liengu la Mongbango. If a young girl disappears into the bush, her female relatives try to track her down by singing to her in the liengu language and carrying cult insignia made of wicker. When they find her, they hide her away for several months (outsiders may visit, however). Afterward, the cult prepares a feast for the girl. She and her sponsor then go alone into the forest. The initiate dresses in traditional regalia of fern fronds and rubs her body with red camwood. She is then led back to the village tied to the middle of a long rope. Two groups play a tug of war over her until the rope breaks, and she collapses. The cult members call to her nine times in the liengu language, which causes her to stand back up. After a few more weeks of taboos, a traditional healer bathes her in a stream, and her initiation ends. This process also takes most of a year.

References
Austen, Ralph A. and Derrick, Jonathan (1999). Middlemen of the Cameroons Rivers: The Duala and their Hinterland c. 1600 – c. 1960. Cambridge: Cambridge University Press.
"The Liengu Cult (Mermaid Cult)". Bakwerirama.
Ardener, Edwin (1975). "Man, Mouse, Ape and Water Spirit". Belief and the Problem of Women.
Martin, Wose Yangange. "Efasa Moto, the God of Mount Fako".
Monga, Yvette (2000). "« Au village! »: Space, culture and politics in Cameroon". Cahier d'Études Africaines, 160.
Wilcox, Rosalinde G. (2002). "Commercial transactions and cultural interactions from the Delta to Douala and beyond". African Arts Spring.

Female legendary creatures  
Fortune goddesses
Health goddesses
Religion in Cameroon
Water spirits
West African legendary creatures